In computer programming, GNU Libtool is a software development tool, part of the GNU build system, consisting of a shell script created to address the software portability problem when compiling shared libraries from source code.
It hides the differences between computing platforms for the commands which compile shared libraries.
It provides a commandline interface that is identical across platforms and it executes the platform's native commands.

Rationale 

Different operating systems handle shared libraries differently.
Some platforms do not use shared libraries at all.
It can be difficult to make a software program portable: the C compiler differs from system to system; certain library functions are missing on some systems; header files may have different names.
One way to handle this is to write conditional code, with code blocks selected by means of preprocessor directives (#ifdef); but because of the wide variety of build environments this approach quickly becomes unmanageable.
The GNU build system is designed to address this problem more manageably.

Libtool helps manage the creation of static and dynamic libraries on various Unix-like operating systems.
Libtool accomplishes this by abstracting the library-creation process, hiding differences between various systems (e.g. Linux systems vs. Solaris).

GNU Libtool is designed to simplify the process of compiling a computer program on a new system, by "encapsulating both the platform-specific dependencies, and the user interface, in a single script".

When porting a program to a new system, Libtool is designed so the porter need not read low-level documentation for the shared libraries to be built, rather just run a configure script (or equivalent).

Use 

Libtool is used by Autoconf and Automake, two other portability tools in the GNU build system.
It can also be used directly.

Clones and derivatives 

Since GNU Libtool was released, other free software projects have created drop-in replacements under different software licenses.

See also 

 GNU Compiler Collection
 GNU build system
 pkg-config

References

External links 
 
 Autobook homepage 
 Autotools Tutorial
 Avoiding libtool minefields when cross-compiling 
 Autotools Mythbuster

Compiling tools
Libtool
Free computer libraries
Cross-platform software